Coby Connell (born 20 June) is an Australian actress. She is known for Almost (2007), The Big Squeeze (2007) and Packed to the Rafters (2008).
Connell has also appeared in numerous advertising campaigns including the controversial Carefree advertisements in 2012. The actress, originally from Sydney's eastern suburbs now lives in Los Angeles.

References

External links

Australian expatriate actresses in the United States
Australian film actresses
Australian television actresses
Living people
Actresses from Sydney
21st-century Australian actresses
Year of birth missing (living people)